Naresh Kumar Baliyan (2 August 1935  13 March 2013) was an Indian politician. He belonged to the Bharatiya Janata Party. He was a member of the Lok Sabha representing the Muzaffarnagar constituency.

Early life and education 
Baliyan was born on August 2, 1935, in Sisauli. He received his MA and BT Degree from Agra University.

Political career
Naresh Baliyan elected to Lok Sabha in 1991 from Muzaffarnagar Lok Sabha Seat by defeating Mufti Muhammad Sayeed a heavyweight politician of Indian Politics.
In 1996 Lok Sabha Election Baliyan failed to secured ticket again that ended his political career.

References 

1935 births
2013 deaths
People from Muzaffarnagar
India MPs 1991–1996
Lok Sabha members from Uttar Pradesh
Bharatiya Janata Party politicians from Uttar Pradesh